Baraboo station, otherwise known as the Baraboo Chicago & North Western Depot and Division Offices is a former railway station in Baraboo, Wisconsin, built be the Chicago and North Western Railway (C&NW). The depot served both passengers and freight traffic as well as housing the Madison Division offices of the C&NW. The Madison Division covered a  line from Belvidere, Illinois to Medary, Wisconsin. The depot was designed by the team of Frost and Granger, who designed more than 200 depots for the C&NW. This particular depot was built in the Romanesque Revival style. Passenger service to the depot ended in 1963 with the elimination of the Rochester 400. As of 2022, the Sauk County Historical Society hopes to restore the depot into a museum and community gathering space.

The building was listed on the National Register of Historic Places on April 25, 2022.

References

Railway stations on the National Register of Historic Places in Wisconsin
National Register of Historic Places in Sauk County, Wisconsin
Baraboo
Former railway stations in Wisconsin
Charles Sumner Frost buildings
Brick buildings and structures
Railway stations in the United States opened in 1902
Railway stations closed in 1963